Sir George Oughtred Courtenay, 1st Baronet, of Newcastle ( – 1644) was an Irish landowner and soldier. He defended Limerick at the siege of 1642 during the Irish Rebellion of 1641.

Birth and origins 
George was born between 1580 and 1585, the fourth son of William Courtenay and his first wife, Elizabeth Manners. His father was a member of the Devonshire gentry but would much later in 1831 be recognised as de jure 3rd Earl of Devon. His father's family was the English branch of the House of Courtenay. His mother was a daughter of Henry Manners, 2nd Earl of Rutland in England.

Plantation of Munster 
His father was an undertaker in the Plantation of Munster after the Desmond Rebellions and was in 1585 granted the seignory of Newcastle, 10,500 acres, in the Barony of Connello, in the western part of County Limerick.

Between 1598 and 1611 Courtenay bought the seignories of Mayne (south east of Newcastle) and Beauly (also called Muskrinownan) from Sir Henry Oughtred's heirs, increasing his lands in Munster from 10,500 to 33,678 acres. Oughtred had died childless in 1599 and was his father's stepfather.

Marriage and children 
George Courtenay married Catherine Berkeley before 1616. Her father was Francis Berkeley of Askeaton, County Limerick, third son of Maurice Berkeley of Bruton in Somerset. Her uncle Captain Edward Berkeley had in 1585 or 1586 been made Constable of Askeaton Castle, which had been taken by the English in April 1580 soon after the beginning of the Second Desmond Rebellion.

 
George and Catherine had three sons:
William (1616–1652), 2nd Baronet, died without son
Francis (1617–1660), 3rd Baronet
Morris, died without issue

Baronet 
In 1622 Courtenay was created 1st Baronet Courtenay of Newcastle, County Limerick. In that year he was also appointed constable of Limerick Castle. His father died on 24 June 1630. His elder brother Francis Courtenay became de jure Earl of Devon and inherited the English lands. George inherited the Irish land.

Siege of Limerick 

In May and June 1642, Courtenay defended King John's Castle, Limerick's citadel, against the Munster rebels under General Garret Barry, Patrick Purcell of Croagh, Lord Muskerry, and Maurice Roche, 8th Viscount Fermoy. The besiegers attacked the eastern wall and the bastion on its south-east corner by digging mines. Courtenay surrendered the castle on 21 June and Muskerry took possession.

Loss of Newcastle 
In July and August 1642 Purcell besieged Newcastle, Courtenay's seat, which fell on 6 August after a cannon had been brought from Limerick.

Death and timeline 
Sir George died in 1644. He was succeeded by his eldest surviving son, Sir William Courtenay, 2nd Baronet.

Notes and references

Notes

Citations

Sources 

 
  – 1611 to 1625
  – Dacre to Dysart (for his father as de jure Earl of Devon)
 
 
  – (for timeline)
 
 
 
 
 
 
  – (Preview)

1580s births
1644 deaths
Kingdom of England people in the Kingdom of Ireland